Ruud Kaiser (born 26 December 1960) is a Dutch association football manager and former player, who played as a midfielder.

Playing career
Born in Amsterdam, Kaiser began his career with his hometown club, Ajax, before leaving in 1980 to join Antwerp. He would later play for Coventry City and OGC Nice before returning to the Netherlands with FC Den Bosch and SVV. He ended his career in Belgium with KFC Dessel Sport.

Coaching career
Kaiser then moved into coaching, where he has earned a reputation as a specialist at spotting and working with young players. Kaiser spent seven years at TOP Oss, working in a variety of sporting development roles, before taking on his first managerial responsibilities at RBC, whom he managed from 1997 to 1999. He then moved to the Royal Dutch Football Association, where he initially served as assistant manager to the Olympic team, who were unable to qualify for the 2000 Olympics. In 2001, he took over as head coach of the Netherlands under-17 team, where he had his greatest successes. Working with future stars such as Rafael van der Vaart, Robin van Persie, Nigel de Jong, Arjen Robben and Wesley Sneijder, he led the team to runner-up spot in the 2005 UEFA European Under-17 Football Championship and third place in the 2005 FIFA U-17 World Championship. During this time he also headed up international scouting for the Dutch FA.

From 2006 to 2007 Kaiser was coach of the Chelsea Academy, and was appointed as Dynamo Dresden manager in July 2008, replacing Eduard Geyer who was fired on 4 October 2009.

Dynamo struggled for the first half of Kaiser's first season in charge, with the team generally performing well, but unable to convert this into goals. Things picked up in the second half of the season, though, and the team finished in a respectable position in the top half of the 3. Liga table. However, the following season also started badly, and in October, with six defeats in the first twelve games, Dynamo found themselves in the relegation zone, and Kaiser was sacked.

In April 2010 Kaiser signed a two-year contract with Regionalliga Nord side 1. FC Magdeburg, taking over managing duties on 1 July 2010. He is the first foreign manager at the club and is tasked with building a squad that is capable of winning promotion in the 2011–12 season. However, after a string of bad results brought the side dangerously close to relegation, Kaiser was let go on 17 March 2011, to be succeeded by Wolfgang Sandhowe. After being technical director of Lierse SK for two years, Kaiser returned to a managerial role by signing with Eerste Divisie side FC Den Bosch from July 2013.

References

 

1960 births
Living people
Association football midfielders
Dutch footballers
AFC Ajax players
Royal Antwerp F.C. players
Coventry City F.C. players
OGC Nice players
FC Den Bosch players
SV SVV players
K.F.C. Dessel Sport players
Eredivisie players
Eerste Divisie players
Belgian Pro League players
English Football League players
Ligue 2 players
Dutch expatriate footballers
Expatriate footballers in England
Expatriate footballers in France
Dutch football managers
Chelsea F.C. non-playing staff
RBC Roosendaal managers
FC Den Bosch managers
Dynamo Dresden managers
Footballers from Amsterdam
1. FC Magdeburg managers
Achilles '29 managers
3. Liga managers